Martinroda is a village and a former municipality in the Wartburgkreis district of Thuringia, Germany. Since 31 December 2013, it is part of the town Vacha.

References

Wartburgkreis